Alberto Trillo (born 19 March 1939) is an Argentine former cyclist. He competed at the 1960 Summer Olympics and the 1964 Summer Olympics.

References

External links
 

1939 births
Living people
Argentine male cyclists
Olympic cyclists of Argentina
Cyclists at the 1960 Summer Olympics
Cyclists at the 1964 Summer Olympics
Cyclists from Buenos Aires
Pan American Games medalists in cycling
Pan American Games silver medalists for Argentina
Cyclists at the 1963 Pan American Games